Ten Good Reasons is the debut studio album by Australian pop star and actor Jason Donovan. It was released on 1 May 1989 by PWL (UK) and Mushroom Records (Australia). It became the biggest selling album in the UK that year, and yielded three number-one singles, "Too Many Broken Hearts", "Sealed with a Kiss" and a duet with Kylie Minogue, "Especially for You".

The album entered the UK Albums Chart at number two, and then reached number one, staying there for four weeks. When his cover of Brian Hyland's "Sealed with a Kiss" entered the UK Singles Chart at number one, Donovan became the first Australian male to hold both UK single and UK album chart number-one positions simultaneously. In Australia, the album peaked at number five on its debut on the ARIA albums chart in June 1989, and became the 53rd highest selling album in Australia for 1989.

The album was reissued in 2010 as an expanded deluxe edition featuring B-sides and remixes. In 2016, the first CD of the 2010 reissue was reissued again as part of promotion for Donovan's Ten Good Reasons live shows.

Track listing

Charts

Weekly charts

Year-end charts

Certifications

References

External links
Discogs

1989 debut albums
Albums produced by Stock Aitken Waterman
Jason Donovan albums
Mushroom Records albums